Dannie Heineman Prize for Mathematical Physics is an award given each year since 1959 jointly by the American Physical Society and American Institute of Physics. It is established by the Heineman Foundation in honour of Dannie Heineman. As of 2010, the prize consists of US$10,000 and a certificate citing the contributions made by the recipient plus travel expenses to attend the meeting at which the prize is bestowed.

Past Recipients
Source: American Physical Society

2022 Antti Kupiainen and Krzysztof Gawędzki
2021 Joel Lebowitz
2020 Svetlana Jitomirskaya
2019 T. Bill Sutherland, Francesco Calogero and Michel Gaudin
2018 Barry Simon
2017 Carl M. Bender
2016 Andrew Strominger and Cumrun Vafa
2015 Pierre Ramond
2014 Gregory W. Moore 
2013 Michio Jimbo and Tetsuji Miwa
2012 Giovanni Jona-Lasinio
2011 Herbert Spohn
2010 Michael Aizenman
2009 Carlo Becchi, Raymond Stora and Igor Tyutin
2008 Mitchell Feigenbaum
2007 Juan Maldacena and Joseph Polchinski
2006 Sergio Ferrara, Daniel Z. Freedman and Peter van Nieuwenhuizen
2005 Giorgio Parisi
2004 Gabriele Veneziano
2003 Yvonne Choquet-Bruhat and James W. York
2002 Michael B. Green and John Henry Schwarz
2001 Vladimir Igorevich Arnold
2000 Sidney R. Coleman
1999 Barry M. McCoy, Tai Tsun Wu and Alexander B. Zamolodchikov
1998 Nathan Seiberg and Edward Witten
1997 Harry W. Lehmann
1996 Roy J. Glauber
1995 Roman W. Jackiw
1994 Richard Arnowitt, Stanley Deser and Charles W. Misner
1993 Martin C. Gutzwiller
1992 Stanley Mandelstam
1991 Thomas C.Spencer and Jürg Fröhlich
1990 Yakov Sinai
1989 John S. Bell
1988 Julius Wess and Bruno Zumino
1987 Rodney Baxter
1986 Alexander M. Polyakov
1985 David P. Ruelle
1984 Robert B. Griffiths
1983 Martin D. Kruskal
1982 John Clive Ward
1981 Jeffrey Goldstone
1980 James Glimm and Arthur Jaffe
1979 Gerard 't Hooft
1978 Elliott Lieb
1977 Steven Weinberg
1976 Stephen Hawking
1975 Ludwig D. Faddeev
1974 Subrahmanyan Chandrasekhar
1973 Kenneth G. Wilson
1972 James D. Bjorken
1971 Roger Penrose
1970 Yoichiro Nambu
1969 Arthur S. Wightman
1968 Sergio Fubini
1967 Gian Carlo Wick
1966 Nikolai N. Bogoliubov
1965 Freeman J. Dyson
1964 Tullio Regge
1963 Keith A. Brueckner
1962 Léon Van Hove
1961 Marvin Leonard Goldberger
1960 Aage Bohr
1959 Murray Gell-Mann

See also
 Dannie Heineman Prize for Astrophysics
 List of mathematics awards
 List of physics awards
 Prizes named after people

References

External links
Official page at American Physical Society

Awards of the American Physical Society
Awards of the American Institute of Physics
Mathematics awards
Awards established in 1959
Mathematical physics